Joseph Leonidovich Raihelgauz (Reichelhaus) (born June 12, 1947, Odessa) is a  Soviet and Russian theater director, teacher; People's Artist of Russia (1999), professor of the Russian University of Theatre Arts (GITIS), founder and artistic director of the Moscow theater School of Modern Drama. Member of the Public Council of the Russian Jewish Congress.

In 2012, he signed an open letter calling for the release of the participating group Pussy Riot.

References

External links
 LiveJournal
 Сын еврейских колхозников

1947 births
Theatre people from Odesa
Living people
Russian theatre directors
Recipients of the Order of Honour (Russia)
People's Artists of Russia
Soviet theatre directors